Arifiye station is a railway station on the Istanbul-Ankara railway in the town of Arifiye, a suburb of Adapazarı. The station is served by the Turkish State Railways as well as Adaray commuter service. The State Railways operates its premier high-speed rail service from Istanbul to Ankara and Konya as well as a premier limited-stop regional train service to Istanbul. Adaray operates commuter rail service to Adapazarı from Arifiye, which is the southern terminus.

Arifiye was originally opened on 1 September 1891 by the Anatolian Railway and taken over by the Turkish State Railways in 1927. The station was rebuilt in 1977 to increase capacity and rebuilt again between 2012-14 to accommodate a new high-speed rail service.

References

1891 establishments in the Ottoman Empire
Railway stations in Sakarya Province
Railway stations opened in 1891
Arifiye
High-speed railway stations in Turkey